Jacques Lonchampt (10 August 1925 in Lyon – 27 December 2014 in Paris) was a French music critic.

Awards 
 Chevalier de la Légion d'honneur.

Publications 
 Le Bon Plaisir : journal de musique contemporaine, Paris, .
 Journal de musique, Paris, L'Harmattan.
 Voyage à travers l'opéra, Paris, L'Harmattan .
 Regards sur l'opéra : de Verdi à Georges Aperghis, Paris, L'Harmattan .
 Dictionnaire pratique des compositeurs et des œuvres musicales, Jeunesses musicales de France.
  Contribution to the extension of l'Histoire de la musique by Émile Vuillermoz, Paris, Le Livre de Poche, 1977, (out of print).

References

External links 

1925 births
2014 deaths
Writers from Lyon
French music critics
20th-century French journalists
Chevaliers of the Légion d'honneur